Nansi Williams (1922–1966) was a school dinner lady at Pantglas Junior School in Aberfan, Wales. She is known in Wales and throughout the UK as one of the heroes of the Aberfan disaster of 1966, sacrificing her own life to save five children.

Personal life
Nansi Williams (née O'Brien) was born in 1922 in the Aberfan Cemetery House, the daughter of Dennis and Maud O'Brien. She married David R Williams but the couple had no children. She died on 21 October 1966 in the Aberfan disaster. She is buried in Aberfan Cemetery.

Aberfan disaster
Williams was a school meals clerk at Pantglas Junior School in Aberfan. On 21 October 1966, she was collecting school dinner money when slurry from the colliery spoil tip hit the school. She told the children who were queuing up to get on the ground and flung herself on top of them. Williams was killed instantly but all five of the children she shielded survived. When her body was later recovered, rescuers found she was still holding a pound note she had been collecting as lunch money.

The BBC screened a documentary to mark the 50th anniversary of the disaster called Surviving Aberfan.  Karen Thomas, one of the children shielded by Williams, described to BBC Wales in an interview how her life had been saved by William's quick thinking: 
"At the other end of the hall glass started coming down the corridor from the head mistress's room and Nansi the dinner lady jumped on top of us. The wall I think more or less pushed us all together and she took the full impact." Thomas and the other children did not realise initially that Williams was dead and attempted to pull her hair to wake her.

References

1922 births
1966 deaths
People from Aberfan
Accidental deaths in Wales